Benjamín Ignacio Ruiz Herrera (born 21 August 1983) was a Chilean footballer who played as right back.

His last club was then Primera B side Unión La Calera.

Club career
He began his career at powerhouse club Universidad Católica, joining then in 2001 to Audax Italiano, remaining there five seasons, until the coach Claudio Borghi called him for play at Colo-Colo, most successful club of the country, where he won the Torneo de Apertura, his first professional title.

Two seasons later, Benjamín earned with Everton, another honour in his career, under the orders of veteran head coach Nelson Acosta.

Honours

Club
Colo-Colo
Primera División de Chile (1): 2006 Apertura

Everton
Primera División de Chile (1): 2008 Apertura

External links

1983 births
Living people
Chilean footballers
Chile international footballers
Chilean Primera División players
O'Higgins F.C. footballers
Club Deportivo Universidad Católica footballers
Everton de Viña del Mar footballers
Audax Italiano footballers
C.D. Huachipato footballers
Colo-Colo footballers
Club Deportivo Palestino footballers
Ñublense footballers
Association football defenders
Footballers from Santiago